Gobindaganj Government High School (GGHS) is a secondary school in Rangpur Division, Bangladesh. It stands on the central town area of Gobindaganj, Gobindaganj Upazila, Gaibandha District. It was established in 1912.

EIIN: 121195

History

Gobindaganj Government High School (GGHS) was most probably established in 1884 as Gobindaganj ME School under the greater district:  Rangpur, Subdivision:    Gaibandha, P.S: Gobindaganj, Mauja: Buzruk Boalia, It is situated in the heart of  Golapbag  bandar by  the  western side of the Dhaka-Rangpur high way. That time the Jamindar  of  Babanpur Mr.  S. N. Roy Chudhury established the school. Then in 1912 it recognized as   H.E School under  kolkata university . Jamindar Mr. Proddut kumar Tagore of  Sundarganj  donated  1.59 acres of land for the School. Later 2.10 acres of land purchased  by the School authority  Now the  total land is 3.69 acres, where the  main building  of School is situated. The School building is framed as one storied pucca building in 1940. Now the government declared it as Model School. There is a semi Pucca hostel of 74 seats.

In 1966 the Science group was opened and in 1968 by the opening of Agriculture group the School named as Gobindaganj  Bahumukhi  (M.L) High School. In 1969 the Board Selected the School as S.S.C Examination Center. After establishment the result of Entrance, Matriculation, and S.S.C Exam. is highly  satisfactory.

In the long period the students of the school take part in the  social and national activities  of the state. Such as   the first Speaker  of Bangladesh  national assembly Late  Shah Abdul Hamid, The Army Chief of INDIA Late. J.N Roy Chowdhary, the famous  Agriculturist   Mr. Kaji Badruddoza was the  Students of the School . Some Student  serve their lives as Doctor, Engineer, university teachers,  Judges, Army officer, Police officer and  Businessman, Some of the  Students  were Freedom Fighter.

The name of the Head master Since 1912 is given below.

    1.	Mr. Shital Kumar Majumder	       (1912-1928)
    2.	Mr. Khirod Lal Chowdhary	       (1928-1948)
    3.	Mr. Mohammad Ali	               (1948-1973)
    4.	Mr. Wazed Ali Khandker	               (1973-1991)
    5.	Mr. Abdur Rashid Akand	               (1991-2001)
    5.	Mr. Abdur Razzak Akand (incharge)      (2001-2003)
    6.	Mr. A.B.M Kamrul Hoda	               (2003-2019) 
    7.   Mr. Mokarram Hossain (incharge)        (2019–2020)
    8.   Mst. Rumila Yasmin Sathi               (2020-Present)

Official Website: gmmhs.edu.bd

References

2. Ariful Islam(2020). School website

High schools in Bangladesh
Schools in Gaibandha District
1912 establishments in India